Thomas Grace (1770–1848) was Archdeacon of Ardfert from 1808 to 1836.

Grace was educated at Trinity College, Dublin.  He held Incumbencies at Ballinvoher and Westport.

He died on 8 February 1848.

References

Alumni of Trinity College Dublin
Archdeacons of Ardfert
1770 births
1848 deaths
Clergy from County Kerry
Diocese of Limerick, Ardfert and Aghadoe